Somatidia terrestris is a species of beetle in the family Cerambycidae. It was described by Broun in 1880. It contains the varietas Somatidia terrestris var. fuscata.

References

terrestris
Beetles described in 1880